The Maecenas-Ehrung is a distinction awarded by the German Arbeitskreis selbständiger Kultur-Institute, AsKI. (engl.: Association of Independent Cultural Institutions). The distinction is awarded biennially to personalities that have significantly promoted art and culture in Germany. An independent jury selects the laureates.

With the Maecenas distinction the AsKI honors privately financed promotion of culture. It is to communicate the results of and to encourage for new patronage. Part of the Maecenas-Ehrung is the presentation of a piece of art or adequate honorable gift, since 2003 a bronze sculpture of the artist Manfred Sihle-Wissel.

The AsKI has been founded in 1967 as an association of today 35 nationally and internationally renowned independent cultural and research institutions. With valuable collections they particularly represent the quality and variety of German culture.

Laureates 
 2009 - Anette und Udo Brandhorst
 2007 – Berthold Leibinger
 2005 – Prince Michael von Sachsen-Weimar-Eisenach
 2003 – Günter Braun and Waldtraut Braun 
 2001 – Udo van Meeteren 
 1999 – Clara Freifrau von Arnim and Wolf-Dietrich Speck von Sternburg
 1997 – Paul Sacher
 1995 – Henri Nannen
 1993 – Marion Ermer
 1991 – Alfred C. Toepfer
 1989 – Arend Oetker

See also
 List of awards for contributions to culture
 Gaius Maecenas, Roman advisor and eponym of the Maecenas distinction

References

External links 
 Maecenas-Ehrung des AsKI e. V. (in German)

Awards established in 1989
Awards for contributions to culture
Gaius Maecenas